The Executive Council of Saskatchewan (informally and more commonly, the Cabinet of Saskatchewan) is the cabinet of that Canadian province.

Almost always made up of members of the Legislative Assembly of Saskatchewan, the Cabinet is similar in structure and role to the Cabinet of Canada while being smaller in size.  As federal and provincial responsibilities differ there are a number of different portfolios between the federal and provincial governments.

The Lieutenant-Governor of Saskatchewan, as representative of the King in Right of Saskatchewan, formally heads the council. The lieutenant-governor does not normally attend its meetings and in practice the Premier of Saskatchewan is its most powerful member. (However, many of its documents are referred to as being issued by the Governor-in-Council.) Other members of the Cabinet, the ministers, are selected by the Premier of Saskatchewan and appointed by the Lieutenant-Governor. Most cabinet ministers are the heads of ministries, but this is not always the case.

As at the federal level, the most important Cabinet post after that of the Premier is Minister of Finance. The next most powerful position is, arguably, Minister of Health, since the Ministry has a vast budget and is of central political import. Other powerful portfolios include Justice, Education, and Energy and Resources.

Current Cabinet
The current ministry has been in place since 2007, when the Saskatchewan Party won the general election of that year under the leadership of Brad Wall.  The government was returned to office after the elections of 2011 and 2016. On February 2, 2018, Scott Moe succeeded Wall as Premier, and a new cabinet was formed.

The list of Cabinet members below is current as of November 9, 2020. Members are listed in order of precedence.

References